Oleru is a village in Guntur district of the Indian state of Andhra Pradesh. It is the located in Bhattiprolu mandal of Tenali revenue division. It forms a part of Andhra Pradesh Capital Region. It is situated near Krishna River in the Coastal Andhra region of the state.

Geography 

Governance 

Oleru gram panchayat is the local self-government of the village. It is divided into wards and each ward is represented by a ward member.

Education 

As per the school information report for the academic year 2018–19, the village has a total of 6 schools. These schools include 2 private and 4 Mandal Parishad schools.

Transport 

National Highway 216 passes through the village.

See also 
List of villages in Guntur district

References 

Villages in Guntur district